Austre Hestlægerhøe is a mountain on the border of Vågå Municipality and Lom Municipality in Innlandet county, Norway. The mountain is surrounded by several other notable mountains including Styggehøi and Vestre Hestlægerhøe to the west, Glittertinden to the northwest, Nautgardsoksli and Nautgardstinden to the east, and Stornubben and Hindnubben to the northeast.

See also
List of mountains of Norway

References

Lom, Norway
Vågå
Mountains of Innlandet